The 43rd FIS Nordic World Ski Championships were held from 21 February to 5 March 2023 in Planica, Slovenia.

Championships
Slovenia hosted the Nordic World Championships for the first time. All competitions took place at the Planica Nordic Centre, located in the Planica monument valley.

Host selection
The World Championships were awarded at the 51st FIS Congress, held between 13 and 19 May 2018 in Costa Navarino, Greece. Planica's bids to host the championships had been unsuccessful on three previous occasions.

The detailed application had to be submitted by 1 September 2017. On 17 May 2018, Planica was announced as the host, beating Norwegian Trondheim.

Venues
Bloudkova velikanka is a large hill (HS138), completely rebuilt in 2012 after the previous hill collapsed. A total of ten world records were set on the hill.
Srednja skakalnica is a normal hill (HS102) standing right next to Bloudkova velikanka, and hosted events in ski jumping and nordic combined.
Rateče Planica track is a cross-country skiing track that stretches across the entire valley between Rateče and Planica.

Schedule
All times are local (UTC+1).

Ski jumping

Nordic combined

Cross-country

Participating nations
Over 2,000 athletes from 66 countries participated at the Championships.

Medal summary

Medal table

Cross-country skiing

Men

Women

Nordic combined

Men

Women

Mixed

Ski jumping

Men

Women

Mixed

References

External links
Official website

 
FIS Nordic World Ski Championships
2023 in cross-country skiing
2023 in ski jumping
2023 in Slovenian sport
International sports competitions hosted by Slovenia
Nordic skiing competitions in Slovenia
February 2023 sports events in Europe
March 2023 sports events in Europe